Kress Building is a historic commercial building located at Columbia, South Carolina across the street from the Columbia Museum of Art. It was built in 1934 by S. H. Kress & Co., and is a two-story, Art Deco style building faced with white terra cotta and colored terra cotta ornamentation. It features rounded storefront windows and cornice that contains the word "Kress" and surmounted by a stepped parapet.

As of 2016, the bottom floor is a Brazilian Steakhouse and the 2nd floor houses apartments. A penthouse is planned for the roof. 

It was added to the National Register of Historic Places in 1979.

References

Commercial buildings on the National Register of Historic Places in South Carolina
Art Deco architecture in South Carolina
Commercial buildings completed in 1934
Buildings and structures in Columbia, South Carolina
National Register of Historic Places in Columbia, South Carolina
S. H. Kress & Co.
1934 establishments in South Carolina